Elizaveta Yulyevna Zarubina (1 January 1900 – 14 May 1987;  Ester Yoelevna Rosentsveig (Эстер Иоэльевна Розенцвейг)) was a Soviet spy, podpolkovnik of the MGB. She was known as Elizabeth Zubilin while serving in the United States. Another alias was Elizaveta Gorskaya.

Early years

Born in Rzhavyntsi, in the Khotinsky Uyezd of the Bessarabia Governorate of the Russian Empire (present-day Ukraine) to  Jewish parents, Yoel and Ita Rosentsveig. She studied history and philology at universities in Romania, France, and Austria, and spoke in English, French, German, Romanian, Russian and Yiddish.

Career
Zarubina was one of the most successful agent recruiters, establishing her own illegal network of Jewish migrants from Poland, and recruiting one of Leó Szilárd's secretaries, who provided technical data. She was the wife of Soviet Intelligence Resident Vasily Zarubin. She was an active participant in the revolutionary movement in Bessarabia after World War I. In 1919, she became a member of the Komsomol of Bessarabia. She became part of the Soviet intelligence system in 1924.

In 1923, she joined the ranks of the Austrian Communist Party. From 1924 through 1925, she worked in the embassy and trade delegation of the USSR. From 1925 to 1928, she worked in the Vienna Rezidentura.

In 1929, Zarubina and Yakov Blumkin were posted as illegals in Turkey, where he sold Hasidic manuscripts from the Central Library in Moscow to support illegal operations in Turkey and the Middle East. Soviet intelligence officer Pavel Sudoplatov, who later organized Leon Trotsky's murder, claims in his autobiography that Blumkin gave part of the sale proceeds to Trotsky, who was then in exile in Turkey. 

According to his account, Zarubina had an affair with Blumkin and that was the reason why he was recalled to Moscow and executed. Shortly thereafter (1929), she married Vasily Zarubin, and they traveled and spied together for many years, using the cover of a Czechoslovakian and USA business couple for work in Denmark, Germany, France and the United States.

In the USA
In 1941, the Zarubins were sent to the USA, where Vasily was to serve as the first secretary to the Embassy of the Soviet Union, while Zarubina was responsible for collecting information about the development of nuclear weapons in the USA, as well as to recruit engineers working close to the Manhattan Project as their agents.

In August 1942, Paul Massing notified NKVD that his friend, Franz Neumann, had recently joined the Office of Strategic Services (OSS). Massing reported to Moscow that Neumann had told him he had produced a study of the Soviet economy for the OSS's Russian Department. 

In April 1943, Zarubina met with Neumann, "(Zarubina) met for the first time with (Neumann) who promised to pass us all the data coming through his hands. According to (Neumann), he is getting many copies of reports from American ambassadors ... and has access to materials referring to Germany." 

According to Jerrold and Leona Schecter, Zarubina was "one of the most successful operators in stealing atomic bomb secrets from the United States". Together with Gregory Kheifetz (the Soviet vice-consul in San Francisco from 1941 to 1944), she supposedly set up a social ring of young communist physicists around Robert Oppenheimer at Los Alamos to transmit nuclear weapon plans to Moscow, and befriended him in order to achieve her goal, according to the memories written by Gen. Pavel Sudoplatov.

In 1944, the NKVD agent Vassili Mironov accused the Zarubins of being in secret contact with the FBI. In August 1944, Zarubina and her husband were recalled to Moscow to be investigated. It was found that the accusations from Mironov were false; he was later arrested for slander. Later that same year, she was awarded the Order of the Red Star, after recruiting a total of 22 agents in her network.

Death
Zarubina died in a traffic accident in Moscow on 14 May 1987, aged 87. She was buried at Kalitnikovsky Cemetery.

In Film
Zarubina's life as a spy is told in the 2015 video, "Cold War Secrets: Stealing the Atomic Bomb", directed by Gerard Puechmorel.

References

Sources
John Earl Haynes and Harvey Klehr, Venona: Decoding Soviet Espionage in America, Yale University Press, 1999.  .
 Jerrold L. Schecter and Leona Schecter, Sacred Secrets: How Soviet Intelligence Operations Changed American History,  Potomac Books, 2002.  
Pavel Sudoplatov, Anatoli Sudoplatov, Jerrold L. Schecter, Leona P. Schecter, Special Tasks: The Memoirs of an Unwanted Witness -- A Soviet Spymaster, Boston: Little, Brown and Company, 1994.  
Allen Weinstein and Alexander Vassiliev, The Haunted Wood: Soviet Espionage in America—the Stalin Era, New York: Random House, 1999, pgs. 162, 249-50, 251, 274, 276, 303, 341.  
Edvin Stavinsky "Zarubins-the family "rezidentura"" "Olma-press" 2002 Moscow (in Russian).

External links 
 Irina Titova, "Soviet Spy Who Outwitted Einstein", The Moscow Times, 28 July 2004
  Zoya Zarubina
  Mysterious Erna 

1900 births
1987 deaths
People from Chernivtsi Oblast
People from Khotinsky Uyezd
Bessarabian Jews
Ukrainian Jews
NKVD officers
Soviet spies
Soviet Jews in the military